Armin Aberle (born 13 December 1960) is a German semiconductor scientist and full professor at the National University of Singapore in the field of photovoltaics and solar energy, particularly thin film solar cells.

Aberle was born in Hausach, Germany. In 1988 he attained his undergraduate degree in Physics from the University of Freiburg and in 1992 completed his PhD in Physics at the same university.

He is currently working as Chief Executive Officer, Solar Energy Research Institute of Singapore (SERIS, since April 2012).

Armin has written one book and is the author or co-author of over 240 academic publications and patent applications. Armin has also been involved in attaining over A$26 million in funding for photovoltaic research, including A$12.2 million to create an ARC Centre of Excellence in Photovoltaics and Photonics.

Awards received by Armin Aberle 

1992 Postdoctoral Humboldt Fellowship
2002 Member of Editorial Board of the academic journal Progress in Photovoltaics
Marquis Who's Who in the World (19th, 22nd, 23rd Edition)
Marquis Who's Who in Science and Engineering (4th and 9th Edition)

See also

Photovoltaics
Solar Cell
Solar energy
Solar power in Australia

References 

People associated with solar power
Australian engineers
University of Freiburg alumni
Academic staff of the University of New South Wales
1960 births
Living people